Poland is one of the 51 original members of the United Nations that signed the United Nations Charter on 15 October 1945 and the Declaration by United Nations on 1 January 1942. Since joining the world body, Poland contributes to the United Nations such as peacekeeping missions, with several Polish officers put in charge of thousands of troops forming international contingents in Lebanon and the Golan Heights. In addition, Poland sat on the United Nations Security Council as a non-permanent member six times (1946-1947, 1960, 1970-1971, 1982-1983, 1996-1997, 2018-2019).

Historical background
Poland signed the Declaration by United Nations in 1942. Despite the aggression during World War II, Joseph Stalin invited the Provisional Government of Poland to participate in the United Nations Conference on International Organization in San Francisco in June 1945.

Activities in the United Nations

Peacekeeping
Poland has contributed six soldiers from the Polish Armed Forces in its UN peacekeeping missions.

United Nations Conferences
Since August 1995, the United Nations Information Centre in Warsaw has been raising public awareness of the UN's work. Poland has hosted a number of UN conferences, including the issues on climate change in Poznan (2008) and Warsaw (2013).

References

External links
 Official website of the Permanent Mission of Poland to the UN
 Official website of the Ministry of Foreign Affairs of Poland